Call of Duty: Modern Warfare 2 is a first-person shooter video game developed by Infinity Ward and published by Activision. Released worldwide on November 10, 2009, it generated several controversies. One of the most arguably infamous of these controversies is found in the game's fourth level, "No Russian", where the player controls an undercover CIA agent who participates in a mass shooting at a Moscow airport to gain the trust of a Russian terrorist group. This level was largely criticized for allowing players to partake in a terrorist attack, and international versions of the game were subject to censorship due to the level's content. Allegations of homophobic content arose when Infinity Ward released a video titled "Fight Against Grenade Spam". Some video game journalists chastised the video's use of profanity, and that the video's title forms the acronym F.A.G.S., a pejorative for gay people. In response, Infinity Ward removed the video from YouTube. An easter egg referencing the United States policy "don't ask, don't tell" was also seen as homophobic, though most journalists belittled these allegations. The Windows version of the game was also met with criticism from players, when it was revealed that the game would not support dedicated servers among a litany of other changes. Windows players created an online petition to allow for dedicated servers, receiving over 150,000 signatures in ten days. However, despite these controversies, Call of Duty: Modern Warfare 2 grossed $310 million in its first day of release.

"No Russian"

In the game's third level, "No Russian", the player controls an undercover CIA agent who participates in a mass shooting at a Moscow airport to gain the trust of a Russian terrorist group. It begins with the player walking out of an elevator with four other gunmen, who proceed to open fire on a large group of civilians at a security checkpoint. The player then accompanies the gunmen as they walk through the airport, killing any remaining civilians. The only legitimate targets are a group of security personnel encountered in waves throughout the airport interior, and a more heavily armed gang of riot squad and FSB members deployed on the tarmac. The level is very graphic, as screams can be heard throughout, and the injured crawl away leaving blood trails or perch themselves on tables and stands as they bleed out. However, the player is never forced to partake in the massacre, and may instead let their comrades kill the civilians. If the player does not feel comfortable during the level, they are allowed to skip to the next level with no penalties whatsoever.

Prior to the release of Call of Duty: Modern Warfare 2, footage taken from the "No Russian" level was leaked on the Internet. Though some journalists were cautious towards the level's content, they decided to wait until they could actually play the level to judge its merits. After the game's release, "No Russian" was largely criticized for allowing players to partake in a terrorist attack. Vince Horiuchi of The Salt Lake Tribune felt that the level was in poor taste following the 2009 Fort Hood shooting, and questioned why the level couldn't have been told through a non-interactive cutscene. Marc Cieslak of BBC News was saddened by "No Russian", as he felt it disproved his theory that the video game industry had "grown up". Several prominent British religious leaders condemned "No Russian": Alexander Goldberg of the London Jewish Forum was worried that children would play the level; Fazan Mohammed of the British Muslim Forum described the level as an intimate experience of enacting terrorism; and Stephen Lowe, the retired Bishop of Hulme, felt that the level was "sickening". Due to the graphic content featured in "No Russian", Call of Duty: Modern Warfare 2 was subject to censorship in international versions of the game, including the entire removal of the level from the Russian version. "No Russian" was also included as a mission in Call of Duty: Modern Warfare 2 Remastered, but besides graphical improvements and an easter egg, the level remained virtually unchanged.

Allegations of homophobic content
In October 2009, Infinity Ward posted a video titled "Fight Against Grenade Spam" on YouTube. In the video, professional baseball player Cole Hamels delivers a public service announcement that advocates against the use of grenade spam. Hamels uses profanity in the video, calling grenade spam "for pussies", and says "what the fuck" when he is blown up with grenades. Soon after the video was released, it was quickly discovered that the video's title forms the acronym F.A.G.S., which is a pejorative term against gay people. Phillip Kollar of Game Informer criticized that the title's acronym and use of profanity, and felt that Infinity Ward was condoning homophobic slurs. Freelance journalist Mitchell Dyer echoed Kollar's statement, and commented that the video "seems to enforce the asshole-ry" of homophobic slurs. In response to the backlash, Infinity Ward community manager Robert Bowling remarked that while the video was intended to be a social commentary joke, he understood why people found it offensive, and removed the video from YouTube.

Further allegations of homophobic content arose when an easter egg was discovered in the game's opening tutorial level. If the player remains idle for a brief period of time, they are able to hear one soldier ask another soldier about his sexuality, and then remark "don't ask, don't tell". This easter egg references the United States policy "Don't ask, don't tell", which prevented openly gay people from serving in the United States Armed Forces. Jim Sterling of Destructoid felt that the easter egg was "too silly/stupid" for people to be angry at, while James Sherwood of The Register commented that people were trying to generate controversy over unimportant dialogue. Lyle Masaki of Logo TV's NewNowNext.com deemed the easter egg to be homophobic, but not representative of the game as a whole.

Criticism of the Windows version
In a webcast conducted prior to the game's release, Bowling revealed that the Windows version of Call of Duty: Modern Warfare 2 would not support dedicated servers, and would instead be powered by the IWNet server. Infinity Ward would go on to state that the Windows version would also lack console commands, not support multiplayer matches larger than 18 players, and the inability for players to ban other players who are cheating. These decisions angered many Windows gamers, with Ben Kuchera of Ars Technica commenting: "at launch, this will be one of the most locked-down, inflexible, and gamer-unfriendly game ever created." An online petition was created to have Infinity Ward allow dedicated servers, which surpassed 150,000 signatures in ten days. Additionally, users on Amazon.com submitted over 125 one-star reviews for the Windows version of the game. Mike Griffiths, CEO of Activision, stated that while Infinity Ward was aware of the petition, they weren't overly worried. He commented that IWNet would allow for a "friendly consumer experience", and that the benefits outweighed the negatives. Call of Duty: Modern Warfare 2 would go on to sell more than 4.7 million copies and gross $310 million in the United States and United Kingdom in its first day of release. According to Bowling, while only 3% of the game's sales came from the Windows version in the UK, it still outsold the Windows version of Call of Duty 4: Modern Warfare in its first week.

Incorrect language in Karachi map 
One of the multiplayer maps in Modern Warfare 2 was Karachi, which was based on the real-life city of Karachi in Pakistan. The map contained numerous signs and banners in Arabic rather than Urdu, which is the language spoken in Karachi. This garnered criticism from numerous video game journalists, including Brian Ashcraft from Kotaku  and Jim Sterling from Destructoid. Though the journalists blamed Infinity Ward for being "racially ignorant", there was no official response from the game developer or publisher, and the map remains in its original state.

References

Call of Duty: Modern Warfare 2
Call of Duty: Modern Warfare 2
Call of Duty
LGBT-related controversies in video games